Jukka Taneli Nevakivi, (8 October 1931 in Pudasjärvi), is a Finnish historian. He studied at the University of London, completing his Ph.D. in 1963. Nevakivi was a journalist between 1954 and 1963 for Kaleva and Suomen Kuvalehti. Between 1963 and 1979 he served in the Finnish foreign département in Budapest, Cairo and Paris. In 1980-95 he was professor in political history at Helsinki University.

He published Britain, France, and the Middle East, 1914-1920 in 1968, highlighting the development of Anglo-French relations in the Middle East during the peace settlement of 1919. He has also written extensively about dramatic events in the Finnish republic's history. Amongst his publications are Muurmannin legioona (1970), The appeal that was never made (1976), which is about the Western allies during the Finnish Winter War, and Ystävistä vihollisiksi (1976), about Finland in British politics after the Winter War. He has also written some studies about the years after the Second World War, including Zdanov Suomessa (1995) and Miten Kekkonen pääsi valtaan ja Suomi suomettui (1996). In 2000 he wrote another book about the relationship between the Western allies and Finland during the Winter War, Apu jota ei annettu.

References 
 Uppslagsverket Finland, 3 (2005)

20th-century Finnish historians
1931 births
Living people
People from Pudasjärvi